Liberty Christian School may refer to:
Liberty Christian School (Anderson, Indiana)
Liberty Christian School (Argyle, Texas)
Liberty Christian School (Richland, Washington)